Weird Fish is a lifestyle clothing and accessories retailer, based in the UK. It was founded in 1993.  In 2010 the company was subject of a management buy-out, backed by Piper Private Equity.  At the time of the buyout annual sales were £10m.

The company has fifteen of its own stores around the UK, with over 450 wholesale stockists.

In 2018 they relocated from their offices in Cheltenham to Tewkesbury. Weird Fish decided to relocate its warehouse in 2022 to Bradford to meet increased customer demand and improve stock management efficiencies.

In addition, the retailer has given over 3700 pieces of clothing to Newlife The Charity for Disabled Children. Weird Fish has been working with Newlife charity since 2019 and saw its warehouse relocation as an opportunity to make a significant donation to the organisation.

In January 2022, Weird Fish partnered with sustainability platform Green Story to improve eco transparency with its customers about the environmental benefits of its products. Customers will have the ability to see Weird Fish's positive environmental impact, such as how much money has been saved in car emissions, drinking water, lightbulb energy, and land pesticide usage as a result of a product having switched from regular to organic cotton.

In May 2022, Weird Fish announced new partnerships with Next Plc and Zalando as part of a strategy to expand its international reach and e-commerce division. The collaborations follow Weird Fish's record year of online sales with £21m in total eCommerce revenue in 2021, up from £12m in 2020. At the same time, the retailer announced that it would freeze its prices for the 2022 Spring/Summer season in order to keep its products accessible during the ongoing Cost of Living crisis.

References

External links
 

Clothing retailers of the United Kingdom
Clothing brands of the United Kingdom
Clothing companies established in 1993
Retail companies established in 1993
British brands